Moses Ebiye (born 28 April 1997) is a Nigerian professional footballer who plays for Norwegian club Aalesund, as a forward.

Career

Club
In July 2017, Ebiye signed a four-year contract with Tippeligaen side Lillestrøm. In the summer of 2018 Ebiye went on loan to Strømmen. He returned to Lillestrøm at the end of 2018. In September 2020, Ebiye signed with 1. divisjon side Hamkam.

Career statistics

Club

References

1997 births
Living people
Nigerian footballers
Nigerian expatriate footballers
Nigerian expatriate sportspeople in Norway
Expatriate footballers in Norway
Lillestrøm SK players
Eliteserien players
Association football midfielders
Strømmen IF players
Norwegian First Division players
Hamarkameratene players